Parris Cues are a snooker cue maker headquartered in London. Founded in 1984, the company was started by John Parris as an evolution of a keen interest in Snooker, and the need for maintenance and repair of his own cue.

Parris Cues' products are exclusively produced at the company's Forest Hill, London, UK workshop. The company sells its cues worldwide to players of all cue sports. The first notable major cue repair was performed in 1987, when Steve Davis's cue snapped at the ferrule, whilst playing in the Rothman's Grand Prix. It was decided the best option for repair, whilst maintaining the cue's balance, and therefore playability, was to extend the butt by the same length lost from the tip, but this meant sawing the most famous cue in snooker in two.

Parris Cues have been used by professional players, including Ronnie O'Sullivan, Jimmy White, Steve Davis, Stephen Hendry, Stephen Maguire, John Higgins & Neil Robertson.

References

Cue sports equipment manufacturers
British companies established in 1984
1984 establishments in England
Companies based in the London Borough of Lewisham
Manufacturing companies based in London
Manufacturing companies established in 1984
Sporting goods manufacturers of the United Kingdom